Opisthoteuthis persephone is a cirrate octopus living south of Australia. In particular, it lives in waters off Tasmania, Victoria, New South Wales, and South Australia. It lives near and directly above the seafloor. S. Stillman Berry was the first to scientifically describe this species after capturing eight specimens while aboard the F.I.S. Endeavour in the early 1910s. In describing O. persephone, Berry called it an "exceedingly interesting octopod."

Description
According to the first description as given by Berry, Opisthoteuthis persephone was neither very small nor very large when compared to other octopuses. He described the octopus as being very flat, almost disk-like, with small fins, beak, and eyes. Its arms are short and its body grey. The suckers are very small, with each arm having only one row of suckers.

In 1993, John M. Healy captured another specimen of O. persephone and was able to learn more about how the animal produces sperm. He described the male reproductive system as being similar to animals in the genus Octopus.

References

Notes

Octopuses
Molluscs described in 1918
Cephalopods of Australia